Sophronica rufulescens is a species of beetle in the family Cerambycidae. It was described by Stephan von Breuning in 1940. It feeds on the Monterey pine.

Subspecies
 Sophronica rufulescens annulicornis Breuning, 1956
 Sophronica rufulescens posttriangularis Breuning, 1974
 Sophronica rufulescens rufulescens Breuning, 1940

References

Sophronica
Beetles described in 1940